Telltale were a group of six musicians who regularly appeared on the first two series of the British TV series Rainbow in 1972 and 1973.

Telltale began with Tim Thomas and Hugh Portnow who were working with the Freehold Theatre Company. In 1970, Thomas concentrated on forming a group of musicians and actors, and Portnow joined him a year later. Hugh Fraser, Chris Ashley and Fluff Joinson joined later, with the final member Ted Richards joining the group in the summer of 1972.

Portnow, Fraser and Thomas also wrote the theme tune to Rainbow.

The band feature on a vinyl LP album released by MFP in 1973 called Songs from the Thames Television Children's Programme "Rainbow" (catalogue number MFP50087), which was produced by Anton Kwiatkowski. The group recorded a total of 14 songs for the album, including "Shapes" and "Walk in the Country".

After series two of the show, Telltale were replaced by singing trio Charlie, Karl and Julian (Charlie Dore, Karl Johnson and Julian Littman) in 1974. That trio were later replaced by Rod, Jane and Matthew, the precursors to Rod, Jane and Roger and the more familiar Rod, Jane and Freddy.

Songs from the Thames Television Children's Programme "Rainbow"

Side 1
"Rainbow" (Hugh Fraser, Hugh Portnow, Tim Thomas)
"Up and Down" (Chris Ashley)
"Walk in the Country" (Ashley)
"Autumn's Really Here" (Fluff Joinson)
"Shapes" (Fraser, Portnow, Thomas)
"Windy Day" (Portnow)
"Bookworm Song" (Fraser, Portnow, Thomas)

Side 2
"Little Bit of Happy Music" (Fraser, Portnow, Thomas)
"Round and Round" (Thomas)
"Everything in the Garden Smells Sweet" (Fraser, Portnow, Thomas)
"Skyrider" (Joinson)
"Trees (A Tree, He Asks No Questions)" (Fraser, Portnow, Thomas)
"The Panto Horse" (Thomas)
"Travelling Song" (Thomas)

References

English folk musical groups